Julio Alfredo Jaramillo Laurido (October 1, 1935 – February 9, 1978) was a notable Ecuadorian singer and recording artist who performed throughout Latin America, achieving great fame for his renditions of boleros, valses, pasillos, tangos, and rancheras.

Having recorded more than 2,200 songs throughout his career, his most famous song was and is "Nuestro Juramento" well known throughout all South America. He is considered to be one of the most beloved singers of Ecuador, even before Gerardo Moran, Maximo Escaleras, and many other talents.

Jaramillo recorded with many other noteworthy Latin American artists including Puerto Rican singer, Daniel Santos; fellow Ecuadorian singer, Olimpo Cárdenas; and Colombian singer, Alci Acosta.

Biography

Childhood
Jaramillo was born on October 1, 1935, in Guayaquil, Ecuador. Son of Juan Pantaleón Jaramillo Erazo and Apolonia Laurido Cáceres. His parents moved to Guayaquil from the town of Machachi in search for a better life. He had two siblings, a sister who died at the age of 5 and a brother named Pepe. Their neighbor Ignacio Toapanta let the kids play with his musical instruments, and taught them to play the guitar. Julio later made his own guitar out of bamboo so that he could practice more. Attending the school led by Francisco García Avilés  was probably the final push towards Julio's musical career.

By the age of 17, Jaramillo was becoming famous for having a beautiful and warm voice, and participated in radio programs at "El Condor" radio station. In 1950 he joined with two friends to form a trio and got to visit the provinces of Esmeraldas and Manabi. On one occasion he was forced to return to his job as a shoemaker to survive. Despite the criticisms, penalties, tears and entreaties of his mother, he was unable to leave his bohemian lifestyle and revelers.

Adult life and marriages
At 18, Julio left home, rented an apartment with Irene, with whom he had a baby. Sadly, the baby died after eight months. At this time he worked as a shoemaker, but still insisting unsuccessfully on pursuing a career as a musician. He was often seen at a place called "La Lagartera" serenading people for tips. At "La Lagartera" Julio met other musicians. It was during these years that he came to know Odalina Sánchez at the local Radio El Triunfo. He fell in love with Odalina and left Irene for her. Together they had a son named Francisco, born March 9, 1955. However, before the age of 20 he married María Eudocia Rivera, who was at the time four months pregnant with his child. Still, he kept an ongoing love affair with Odalina.

Back in Guayaquil, he never stopped being "the kid from the block", humble, friendly, bohemian, generous, and joyful.  On Channel 4 he started a TV show, in which he performed frequently and recorded new songs.  However, a life of excesses and lack of control affected his health, which got progressively worse.

Professional career
 With the recording of his first album, "Mi pobre querida Madre" (1954), which was a duet with Fresia Saavedra, his name began to be well-known. This was followed by the Peruvian-style waltz song called "Esposa (wife)" (1955), a duet with Carlos Rubira Infante. In 1956, the Peruvian-style waltz Fatalidad(music by Laureano Martínez Smart, text by Juan Sixto Prieto) marked his breakthrough. It's something between a Peruvian waltz and an Ecuadorian "pasillo." It was a huge success from the very beginning — 6000 copies were sold within a week. By the end of 1956, he had produced a dozen albums under the Onyx label. In 1959, he moved to TV and also the movies. His first film was Mala Mujer or "Wicked Woman". He gained international recognition after the bolero "Nuestro Juramento" (1957), and he made several tours in Latin America. He began a journey through Ecuador, Colombia, Perú, Argentina, Uruguay, and Chile. The Mexican label Peerless became interested in him and sent him on a tour of Peru and Chile. In Colombia, he met up with his brother Pepe, who had previously emigrated to that country. When not on tour, he performed in movie theaters in Guayaquil (it was customary at that time to perform concerts before the main feature). Because of his immense popularity, he started to do pre-movie shows on Saturdays and Sundays, which later became two daily shows, seven days a week. Upon returning to Ecuador, he was arrested and forced into military service.

Returning to civilian life in 1960, he continued his career, reaching sellout performances of up to four consecutive months at  Guayaquil's Guayas Theater. He also had a part in an Ecuadorian movie, "Fiebre de Juventud: Romance en Ecuador", and another one in Argentina. In 1965, he settled in Venezuela and completed successful tours of Mexico, Puerto Rico, and Central America. He also recorded duets with Daniel Santos, Olimpo Cárdenas, and Alci Acosta.

His last international tour was held in the United States and Canada. The scandals of his turbulent life were often also a source of news. He was imprisoned on several occasions, almost always due to crimes against women or noncompliance with the Juvenile Court. Besides being married five times, Julio had children with other women: it's estimated he had up to twenty-eight children. He never denied his humble origins, was always very generous and lavish with his friends, and a stereotype of machismo from his early upbringing.

Operation
On his return to Ecuador in 1975, tired, prematurely aged and corroded by cirrhosis, he was booed at a performance in his hometown because his voice was no longer the same. In his last years of his life, Julio Jaramillo had a radio program at Crystal Radio entitled "The J.J. Hour", whose commercial time did not even generate enough money for him to make a decent living.
During the early days of the month of February 1978, Julio Jaramillo underwent a highly risky medical procedure to remove gallstones. The procedure was successful, but during the postoperative period he was imprudent enough to pull the probes connected to his body. This caused a peritonitis which forced doctors to perform a second operation. However, because of the years as a bohemian and neglect, his body did not respond as expected.

Death
Jaramillo died at the young age of 42. His remains were given a farewell like no other person has known in Guayaquil. It is estimated that there were about 250,000 Ecuadorians at his funeral. His level of popularity in Ecuador could be compared to Frank Sinatra's in the United States, Pedro Infante in Mexico, or Carlos Gardel's in Argentina. Since 1993, his birthday has been commemorated as a national holiday for the pasillo: Día del Pasillo Ecuatoriano (Day of the Ecuadorian Pasillo).

Tribute
On October 1, 2019, Google celebrated his 84th birthday with a Google Doodle.

Notable songs performed

 ¿Para Qué Se Quiere?
 A Mi Madre
 Alma Mía
 Amada Mía
 Amelia
 Amigos y Mujeres
 Amor en Budapest
 Amor Eterno
 Amor Se Escribe Con Llanto
 Amor Sin Esperanza
 Andate
 Aunque Me Duele El Alma
 Ay Mexicanita
 Ayer y hoy
 Azabache
 Botecito de vela
 Carnaval de la vida
 Carta A Mi Madre
 Cenizas
 Cinco Centavitos
 Claro de luna
 Como se adora el Sol
 Como si fuera un niño
 Con toda el alma
 Cuando Llora Mi Guitarra
 De carne y hueso
 De Cigarro En Cigarro
 De corazón a corazón
 Desden
 Deuda
 Devuelveme El Corazon
 Dolor De Ausencia
 Dos Años
 Dos Medallitas
 Ecuador
 El Aguacate
 El Alma En Los Labios
 El regreso
 El tren lento
 En ese mas allá
 En nombre de Dios
 En un bote de vela
 Esposa
 Falsía
 Fatalidad
 Fe Verdadera
 Golondrinas
 Grítalo
 Guayaquil De Mis Amores
 Historia de amor
 Historia de mi vida
 Interrogación
 Infame
 Interrogación
 La Burrita
 Lejano amor
 Llora corazón
 Los Versos De Mi Madre
 Me duele el corazón
 Mi muchachita
 Miedo de hablarte
 Miente el viento
 Mire Comadre Mire
 Niégalo todo
 No me toquen ese vals
 Noches de hungría
 Norma
 Nuestro Juramento
 Ódiame
 Odio En La Sangre
 Pañuelo Blanco
 Pasión de amor
 Pesares
 Porque Dios mío
 Porque eres así
 Que Dios me libre
 Que Nadie Sepa Mi Sufrir
 Que te perdone Dios
 Reminiscencias
 Rondando tu esquina
 Sacrificio
 Se me olvidó otra vez
 Sendas distantas
 Sendero de amor
 Sigue Mintiendo
 Sombras
 Somos differentes
 Sonia
 Soñar Y Nada Más
 Te Esperaré
 Te Odio Y Te Quiero
 Tú Duda y La Mia
 Tu y Yo
 Un Disco Mas
 Una tercera persona
 Usted
 Ya estamos iguales
 Yo no se que me han hecho tus ojos
 Yo Vivo Mi Vida

Songs composed by Julio Jaramillo
According to All Music Guide

 A La Vuelta de la Esquina
 A Mi Madre
 Alguien Me Espera
 Aquellos Ojos
 Arrepentida
 Ay Mexicanita
 Bodas Negras
 Calla Corazón
 Cantando
 Caraqueñita
 Despertar Llorando
 Endechas
 Fiel Amigo
 Guayaquileña
 Hacia el Calvario
 Hermano
 Idolatria
 La Vuelta de la Esquina
 Llegastes
 Llora
 Mentiras y Nada Mas
 Mi Desengaño
 Mi Locura
 Naufragio de Amor
 No la Dejes Marchar
 No Soy Juez
 Que Culpa Tengo
 Que No Te Mire Nadie
 Si Tu Me Has Querido
 Siete Besos
 Sin Venganza
 Tus Besos Fueron Mio
 Vuelve Conmigo
 Yo Era Bueno
 Elsa
 Historia De Amor
 Perdon Por Adorarte
 No Me Lo Digas (tango)

See also
 Los Chalchaleros
 Carlos Gardel
 Daniel Santos
 Pasillo
 Bolero

References

External links

Julio Jaramillo Museum of Popular Music (Guayaquil-Ecuador)1 stand dedicated to Julio Jaramillo 
Biography at mp3.com
Julio Jaramillo discography
Julio Jaramillo, life, mp3s

1935 births
1978 deaths
People from Guayaquil
Ecuadorian people of Spanish descent
Ecuadorian people of Jamaican descent
20th-century Ecuadorian male singers